Qeysariyeh-ye Sofla (also Romanized as Qeysarīyeh-ye Soflá; also known as Qaisarīyeh, Qeyşarīyeh, and Qeyşarīyeh-ye Pā'īn) is a village in Hoveyzeh Rural District, in the Central District of Hoveyzeh County, Khuzestan Province, Iran. At the 2006 census, its population was 322, in 54 families.

References 

Populated places in Hoveyzeh County